CSS, or Cascading Style Sheets, is a language used to describe the style of document presentations in web development.

CSS may also refer to:

Computing and telecommunications
Chirp spread spectrum, a modulation concept, part of the standard IEEE 802.15.4aCSS
Proprietary software, software that is not distributed with source code; sometimes known as closed-source software
Computational social science, academic sub-disciplines concerned with computational approaches to the social sciences
Content Scramble System, an encryption algorithm in DVDs
Content Services Switch, a family of load balancers produced by Cisco
CSS code, a type of error-correcting code in quantum information theory

Arts and entertainment
Campus SuperStar, a popular Singapore school-based singing competition
Closed Shell Syndrome, a fictional disease in the Ghost in the Shell television series
Comcast/Charter Sports Southeast, a defunct southeast U.S. sports cable television network
Counter-Strike: Source, an online first-person shooter computer game
CSS (band), Cansei de Ser Sexy, a Brazilian electro-rock band

Government
Canadian Survey Ship, of the Canadian Hydrographic Service
Center for Strategic Studies in Iran
Central Security Service, the military component of the US National Security Agency
Central Superior Services of Pakistan
Chicago South Shore and South Bend Railroad, a U.S. railroad
Committee for State Security (Bulgaria), a former name for the Bulgarian secret service
KGB, the Committee for State Security, the Soviet Union's security agency
Supreme Security Council of Moldova, named  (CSS) in Romanian

Military
Combat service support
Confederate Secret Service, the secret service operations of the Confederate States of America during the American Civil War
Confederate States Ship, a ship of the historical naval branch of the Confederate States armed forces
Dongfeng missile, a Chinese surface-to-surface missile system (NATO designation code CSS)
HNLMS Den Helder (A834), a ship under construction for the dutch navy, also known as a Combat Support Ship (CSS).

Schools and education
Centennial Secondary School (disambiguation)
Certificat de Sécurité Sauvetage, the former name of Certificat de formation à la sécurité, the French national degree required to be flight attendant in France
Chase Secondary School, British Columbia, Canada
Clementi Secondary School, Hong Kong SAR, China
College of Social Studies, at Wesleyan University, Middletown, Connecticut, USA
College of St. Scholastica, Duluth, Minnesota, USA
Colorado Springs School, Colorado Springs, CO, USA
Columbia Secondary School, New York, NY, USA
Commonwealth Secondary School, Jurong East, Singapore
Courtice Secondary School, Courtice, Canada
Crockett State School, juvenile correctional facility in Crockett, Texas, USA
CSS Profile, College Scholarship Service Profile, a U.S. student aid application form

Space
 Chinese space station, a modular space station project
 Catalina Sky Survey, an astronomical survey
 Commercial space station (disambiguation)
 Control stick steering, a method of flying the Space Shuttle manually

Other organisations
 CS Sfaxien, a Tunisian sport club
 Comcast/Charter Sports Southeast, a cable-exclusive regional sports television network
 Citizens Signpost Service, a body of the European Commission
 Community Service Society of New York
 Congregation of the Sacred Stigmata, or Stigmatines, a Catholic religious order
 Cryptogamic Society of Scotland, a Scottish botanical research society

Medicine and health science
 Cancer-specific survival, survival rates specific to cancer type
 Cytokine storm syndrome
 Churg–Strauss syndrome, a type of autoimmune vasculitis, also known as eosinophilic granulomatosis with polyangiitis
 Cross-sectional study, a study collecting data across a population at one point in time
 Coronary steal syndrome, the syndrome resulting from the blood flow problem called coronary steal
 Carotid sinus syndrome (carotid sinus syncope)—see Carotid sinus § Disease of the carotid sinus

Other uses
 Chessington South railway station, a National Rail station code in England
 Chicago South Shore and South Bend Railroad, a freight railroad between Chicago, Illinois, and South Bend, Indiana
 Constant surface speed, a mode of machine tool operation, an aspect of speeds and feeds
 Context-sensitive solutions, in transportation planning
 Customer satisfaction survey, a tool used in customer satisfaction research
 Cyclic steam stimulation, an oil field extraction technique; see Steam injection (oil industry)
 Cab Signaling System, a train protection system
 Close-space sublimation, a method for producing thin film solar cells, esp. Cadmium telluride
 Competition Scratch Score, an element of the golf handicapping system in the United Kingdom and Republic of Ireland
 The ISO 639-3  code for Southern Ohlone, also known as Costanoan, an indigenous language or language family spoken in California
 Chowk Sarwar Shaheed (CSS), a city in Punjab, Pakistan

See also
 Cross-site scripting (XSS)